Shavar is a given name. Notable people with the given name include:

Shavar Jeffries (born 1974), American civil rights attorney
Shavar McIntosh (born 1997), American actor
Shavar Newkirk (born 1996), American basketball player 
Shavar Ross (born 1971), American actor, film director and screenwriter
Shavar Thomas (born 1981), Jamaican footballer